Winston Branch (born in 1947) is a British artist originally from Saint Lucia, the sovereign island in the Caribbean Sea. He still has a home there, while maintaining a studio in California. Works by Branch are included in the collections of Tate Britain, the Legion of Honor De Young Museum in San Francisco, California, and the St Louis Museum of Art in Missouri. Branch was the recipient of a Guggenheim Fellowship in 1978, the British Prix de Rome, a DAAD (German Academic Exchange Service) Fellowship to Berlin, a sponsorship to Belize from the Organization of American States, and was Artist in Residence at Fisk University in Tennessee. He has been a professor of fine arts and has taught at several art institutions in London and in the US. He has also worked as a theatrical set designer with various theatre groups.

As described by art critic Carlos Diaz Sosa, Branch paints "abstract canvases in cool, cloudy colours that have a quality which allow the viewer to explore the depths of the mind. Branch uses paint like a symbol, a purely aesthetic language, an illustration of spirit."

Sunrise on Bodega Bay

Early years and education 
Born in Castries, Saint Lucia, Branch attended a Catholic school there, before being sent to London at the age of 12 in the 1960s. He explains: "My parents saw I had an aptitude for art and wanted to give me the best opportunity." He studied at the Slade School of Fine Art, University College London, where his talent was recognized early, and after graduating in 1970 he won the prestigious British Prix de Rome, enabling him at the age of 24 to attend the British School at Rome for a year (1971–72). Critic Amon Saba Saakana notes: "Branch had a first hand experience of the Renaissance masters and subsequent developments of art movements in Europe. And though he ingested these European masters, he was searching for a form that incorporated and reflected his beginnings in the Caribbean. Though first working in the figurative tradition, he moved to abstracts as he apprehended the world of colour reflected in the cosmos, lightning, volcanoes, tropical storms, and earthquakes."

Teaching
In 1971, Branch was a visiting tutor at Hornsey College of Art and at Goldsmiths College of Art, London University. His first visit to the US was as Artist-in-Residence at Fisk University, Nashville, Tennessee, in 1973, and in the UK between 1973 and 1992 he also taught at Kingston School of Art, Chelsea Art School and at the Slade School. He was a professor of art at the University of California, Berkeley, and at Kansas State University.

He has also given several public lectures, including at Oakland Museum of California, at the Beach Museum of Art, Kansas State University, and at Barrows Hall, University of California at Berkeley.

Painting
Branch has exhibited his work consistently since the 1960s, including at the Oakland Museum of California, the Alliance Francaise de San Francisco, the permanent collection of the Berkeley Art Museum, the 11th and 23rd São Paulo Art Biennial, Museo de Arte Moderno in São Paulo, the 4th Bienal de Pincture de Cuenca, Modern Art Museum (Cuenca, Ecuador) and the Biennale de Paris, Musée National d'Art Moderne and the John F. Kennedy Center for the Performing Arts.

In 2010 he fell ill while at San Francisco International Airport waiting for a flight in order to exhibit work and give a lecture at the Museum of Modern Art in Santo Domingo, Dominican Republic, and was cared for at the Alta Bates Summit Medical Center, where following his recovery he held an exhibition entitled A Gift of Life (1 May–24 June 2011).<ref>"Gallery Exhibit — Tribute to Alta Bates Summit Staff", Winston Branch: "A Gift of Life" (exhibition brochure).</ref> He has subsequently spent more time in London, where he has a close longtime association with the Chelsea Arts Club.

Most recently, he was one of the artists featured prominently in No Colour Bar: Black British Art in Action 1960–1990 (July 2015–January 2016) at the City of London's Guildhall Art Gallery,"The Artists' Profiles", FHALMA, huntleysonline.com. with three of his paintings hung at the entrance of the exhibition. One of the works shown was his painting West Indian — "a marked exception" to the non-figurative style now more typical of Branch — on loan from Rugby Borough Council's respected collection of 20th- and 21st-century British art, which also includes works by L. S. Lowry, Barbara Hepworth, Stanley Spencer and Bridget Riley.

From early on in his career, Branch's work has won recognition and awards, such as the British Prix de Rome in 1971, a DAAD (German Academic Exchange Service) Fellowship to Berlin in 1976, and a Guggenheim Fellowship in 1978 (in which year he was featured in the international quarterly journal Black Art).Simolke, David, "Winston Branch: A Study in Contrast", Black Art: an international quarterly, Volume 2, Number 2, Winter 1978: 4–8.

His paintings are in public and private collections. Several are in St. Lucia, Germany and France: the British Museum, The Brooklyn Museum, The Arts Council of Great Britain, Sinclair Research Limited (United Kingdom), Victoria and Albert Museum, John Simon Guggenheim Memorial Foundation, Sprint World Headquarters Campus, and Her Majesty's Military Government (Berlin, Germany).

Exhibitions
Individual shows

Group shows

Awards and honours
 2020: Honorary Doctor of Arts, HonDArt, University of Greenwich London, UK 
 1996: Purchase award by the 23rd Bienal de São Paulo
 1995: Mural – Hewanorra International Airport, St. Lucia
 1994: Organization of American States sponsorship to Belize
 1978: John Simon Guggenheim Memorial Fellowship in Painting
 1977: Represented UK at 2nd World Festival of African Arts and Culture, Lagos, Nigeria
 1976: Artists-in-Berlin Programme (Berliner Kunsler Programme des DAAD)
 1973: British Council Award
 1971: Brazilian Government sponsorship to the 11th Bienal de São Paulo, Brazil
 1971: British Prix de Rome, Italy
 1970: Boise Traveling Scholarship

Select bibliography
 2004: Peter Selz, Ronald Alley, Alliance Française, San Francisco, California. 27 March
 2002: "Being There: 45 Oakland Artists" Museum of California, Oakland
 2000: Marianne de Tolentino, "Urban Life in the Caribe" Muséo del Pantéon National, Art Nexus, May 2000, #36 
 2000: Jan Biles, "Inner Vision Drives Artist", Lawrence Journal-World, 9 November 2000
 2000: Jennifer Detweiler, "Sharing His Art", The Manhattan Mercury, Sunday, 8 October 2000
 1999: Wendy Martin, "A Matter of Survival – Portrait of Winston Branch", Women's Studies, No. 3, Volume 28, 
 1999: Julia Sommer, Berkeleyan, "Painter Winston Branch – Visiting Artist Shares His 'Great Love' for Painting & education", August 1999, 
 1998: Ronald Alley, 30th Festival International de La Peinture, Cagnes-Sur-Mer, France, Cat. 1988–1999
 1998: Maria Lluisa Borras and Antonio Zaya, Casa de America, Caribe Insular, Exclusion, Fragmentaçion y Paraiso, Madrid, Spain, Cat. 1998 
 1998: Vlad, "Winston Branch ou les Métaphores de la Liberté", Frances-Antilles Magazine: Arts Plastiques, Saturday, 30 May–5 June 1998
 1997: Holland Cotter, "This Realm of Newcomer, This England", The New York Times, 24 October 1997
 1997: Mora Beauchamp Byrd, Transforming the Crown, 
 1996: André Chahot, 23rd Bienal International Sao Paulo, "The Inner Landscape", Cat. 1996
 1996: Caroline Popovic, "The Precarious Life of Art", B.W.I.A. Caribbean Beat, November–December 1995
 1994: André Chapot, Alliance Française de Roseau, Dominica
 1993: Winston Branch, "In Search of the Green Banana", Evening Standard, 27 January 1993
 1992: Anne Walmsley, The Caribbean Artists Movement: A Literary and Cultural History, 1966–1971, London and Port of Spain: New Beacon Books, 
 1992: Ferdinand Dennis, "Ferdinand Dennis in Conversation with Winston Branch", BBC Radio Forum Work Talk, November 1992
 1992: Michael Fabre, Los Afro Americains et L'Europe (catalogue), Paris: Galerie d'Art Noir Contemporain
 1988: This is London, "Artist Opens City Studio", No. 1708, 30 June 1988
 1987: Rod McLoughlin, "Exploring the Depths", Jersey Evening Post, Friday, 8 May 1987
 1982: Carlos Diaz Sosa, 12th Biennale de Paris, "The Light in the Colors", Museé de Art Moderne de la Ville de Paris, Cat. 1982
 1981: Goethe Institute, "Two Decades of the DAAD's British Artists in Berlin", London, November 1981
 1978: David Simolke, "Winston Branch – A Study in Contrast", Black Art International Quarterly, Volume 2, No. 2, 1978
 1978: Bernd Lubowski, "Ich Lasse Mich von Kimt der Stadt beein Flussen", Berliner Morgenpost, 3 December 1978, #282/81. JAHRG
 1977: Jules Walter, "Winston Branch Painting 1976-77", DAAD: Hochschule der Kunst, Berlin, 1977
 1977: Peter Hans Gopfert, "Malerische Dialoge Zwischen Kalkul und Phantasie", Die Welt, Tuesday, 12 July 1977-B NR 159/28W
 1976: Was ist Wann?, "Winston Branch: Guest of Berlin DAAD", #6, Vol. 15.5–15.8, 1976 
 1973: Dr David C. Driskell, "The Recent Paintings of Winston Branch", The Carl Van Vechten Gallery, Department of Art, Fisk University, Nashville, Tennessee, October 1973
 1973: Clara Hieronymus, "Major Show At Fisk", The Tennessean, Sunday, 14 October 1973

 References 

 External links 
 Official website.
 "Winston Branch CV".
 Molly Tresadern, "Winston Branch: on Ju Ju birds and never staying still" (interview), Art UK, 15 January 2018.
 
 "Winston Branch", Diaspora Arts.
 Eddie Chambers, "Black British artists who should be better known", The I.B. Tauris Blog, 7 August 2014.
 Amon Saakana, "Winston Branch: A painter at the crossroads", Kensington, Chelsea & Westminster Today'', 12 October 2015.

1947 births
Living people
Caribbean art
Saint Lucian artists
Prix de Rome (Britain) winners
Alumni of the Slade School of Fine Art
Black British artists
20th-century British artists
21st-century British artists
Saint Lucian emigrants to the United Kingdom
21st-century male artists